SS David L. Yulee was a Liberty ship built in the United States during World War II. She was named after David Levy Yulee, an American politician and attorney. Born in St. Thomas, then under British control. He later served as Florida's territorial delegate to Congress. Yulee was the first person of Jewish ancestry to be elected and serve as a United States senator. He founded the Florida Railroad Company and served as president of several other companies, earning the nickname of "Father of Florida Railroads".

Construction
David L. Yulee was laid down on 11 September 1944, under a Maritime Commission (MARCOM) contract, MC hull 2500, by the St. Johns River Shipbuilding Company, Jacksonville, Florida; she was sponsored by Mrs. Emory H. Price, the wife of congressman Emory H. Price, and was launched on 10 October 1944.

History
She was allocated to the R.A. Nichol & Company, on 26 October 1944. On 24 September 1948, she was laid up in the National Defense Reserve Fleet, Beaumont, Texas. On 24 April 1952, she was laid up in the Hudson River Reserve Fleet, Jones Point, New York. On 28 April 1953, she was withdrawn from the fleet to be loaded with grain under the "Grain Program 1953", she returned loaded on 7 May 1953. On 14 October 1957, she was withdrawn to be unload, she returned on empty 17 October 1957. On 2 December 1958, she was withdrawn from the fleet to be loaded with grain under the "Grain Program 1958", she returned loaded on 12  December 1958. On 24 July 1959, she was withdrawn to be unload, she returned on empty 30 July 1959. She was sold for scrapping, 23 November 1970, to Hierros Ardes, S.A. She was removed from the fleet on March 29, 1971.

References

Bibliography

 
 
 
 

 

Liberty ships
Ships built in Jacksonville, Florida
1944 ships
Beaumont Reserve Fleet
Hudson River Reserve Fleet
Hudson River Reserve Fleet Grain Program